"Gettin' Ready for Love" is a 1977 hit song by Diana Ross. It was the first single from her Baby It's Me LP. The song was released on October 16, 1977 by Motown Records. It was written by Tom Snow and Franne Golde, and produced by Richard Perry. The song reached #27 on the U.S. Billboard Hot 100 and #29 in Canada.  It also charted in the UK, reaching #23.

"Gettin' Ready for Love" was a much bigger hit on the Adult Contemporary charts of both the U.S. and Canada, peaking at #8 in the U.S. and #6 in Canada.

The song features an alto sax solo and strings, at the bridge.

Personnel
Diana Ross – lead vocals
David Hungate – bass guitar
Steve Lukather – guitar 
Tom Snow – piano
Tom Scott – saxophone solo
Jack Ashford – percussion
Gene Page – strings arrangements, conductor
Jeff Porcaro – drums

Charts

Later uses
 "Gettin' Ready for Love" was included on the 1985 compilation LP, Motown Chartbusters 150 Hits of Gold.
 The song was included in Ross's 1993 compilation LP, Forever Diana: Musical Memoirs.
 Martine McCutcheon recorded a karaoke version in 1999 and included it on her 2012 LP, The Collection.
 Winston Ward covered "Gettin' Ready for Love" for inclusion on the 2008 compilation LP, Northern Soul 2008.

References

External links
 Lyrics of this song
 

1977 singles
Diana Ross songs
Songs written by Tom Snow
Songs written by Franne Golde
1977 songs
Motown singles
Song recordings produced by Richard Perry
Contemporary R&B ballads
1970s ballads
Songs about telephone calls